Marie Paule Woodson is an American politician who served as a member of the Florida House of Representatives for the 101st district from 2020 to 2022.  Due to redistricting, she is now the representative for the 105th district.

Early life and education 
Woodson was born in Port-de-Paix, Haiti. She moved to Florida in 1981, where she earned an Associate of Science degree in public administration from Miami Dade College, a Bachelor of Science in criminal justice from Florida International University, and a Master of Science in public administration and management from St. Thomas University.

Career 
After moving to the United States, Woodson worked in a textile factory. She later worked as a public administrator for the Government of Miami-Dade County for several years. Woodson was elected to the Florida House of Representatives and assumed office on November 3, 2020.

References 

21st-century American politicians
21st-century American women politicians
Florida International University alumni
Haitian emigrants to the United States
Living people
Democratic Party members of the Florida House of Representatives
Miami Dade College alumni
People from Port-de-Paix
St. Thomas University (Florida) alumni
Women state legislators in Florida
Year of birth missing (living people)